North Valley Hospital is a hospital based in Tonasket, Washington, United States, which is a city that is part of the Okanogan region.

References

External links 
 

Buildings and structures in Okanogan County, Washington
Hospitals in Washington (state)